Pittsburgh is a former incorporated and now geographic township in Ontario, Canada. Located within Frontenac County, it was surveyed in 1787–1788 and named for William Pitt the Younger, the British prime minister. It was incorporated on January 1, 1850. The township was amalgamated into the city of Kingston effective January 1, 1998. The community still retains the name "Pittsburgh" within the government of Kingston.

Pittsburgh Township is home to Fort Henry, Canadian Forces Base Kingston, the Royal Military College of Canada and the historic community of Barriefield, Ontario. It includes the east side of the UNESCO-listed Rideau Canal at Kingston Mills (site of the Shafia family murders), hosts a handful of motels serving Ontario Highway 15 and former Ontario Highway 2, a federal prison (Pittsburgh and Joyceville Institutions in Joyceville, Ontario) and three museums (Military Communications and Electronics Museum, RMC Museum and MacLachlan Woodworking Museum).

Pittsburgh Township, separated from Kingston by the Cataraqui River, is linked to the downtown by the La Salle Causeway. As of 2020, a new bridge across the Cataraqui River between the La Salle Causeway and Highway 401 is under construction. It is estimated to be completed by 2022.

Former reeves 
John Marks            1850–1854   
Samuel Rees           1855–1857   
John Ruttan           1858   
Alexander McArthur    1859–1860   
Hugh McCaugherty      1861–1862
James Hutton          1863
William Ferguson Jr.  1864
Martin Strachan       1865–1870, 1876–1879
Peter Graham (W)      1871–1875
Thomas Stark          1880–1881
Richard Patterson     1882–1884
Richard Anglin        1885
Michael Graves        1886
William Hutton        1887–1888, 1890
David Trotter         1889
Thompson Whitney      1891–1893
William Toner         1894
John Kane             1895–1896
John Bennett          1897–1898
Robert McAlpin        1899
Daniel C. McLean      1900
Daniel McLean         1901–1902
Thomas Maxwell        1903
James Greenlee        1904
John McFarlane        1905–1906
William Franklin (W)  1907–1908, 1912–1917
Thomas Spence         1909
James Gordon          1910
David Rogers          1911
George Maitland       1918–1920
John Sibbit (W)       1921–1926, 1932–1938
Alfred Franklin       1927–1928, 1931
William Atkinson      1929–1930
John McMaster (W)     1939–1943
Wilson Franklin       1944–1945
Colin Woods (W)       1946–1950
Robert Wilson         1951–1953
Earl Shepard (W)      1954–1958
Eric Pearson (W)      1959–1966
Hugh Wilson           1967–1968
Wilmer Nuttal (W)     1969–1971
Donald Hunter         1972
Edward Swayne (W)     1973–1980
Hans Westenberg       1981–1982
Vincent Maloney       1983–1985
Cameron English (W)   1986–1988
Barry Gordon          1989–1994
Carl Holmberg         1995–1997

See also
List of townships in Ontario

References

External links
Canada National Atlas Pittsburg listing

Neighbourhoods in Kingston, Ontario
Former municipalities in Ontario
Geographic townships in Ontario
Populated places disestablished in 1998